Shola Maxwell Shoretire (born 2 February 2004) is an English professional footballer who plays as a forward for  club Bolton Wanderers, on loan from  side Manchester United.

Shoretire was a part of Manchester United's youth system from a young age and won the Jimmy Murphy Young Player of the Year award in the 2020–21 season. He signed his first professional contract in February 2021, at the age of 17, and made his first-team debut later that month in a Premier League game against Newcastle United. He holds the record as the youngest player to represent Manchester United in European competition.

Shoretire has played youth international football for England at under-15, under-16, under-18 and under-19 levels. He is also eligible to represent Nigeria at international level.

Club career

Early career 
As a child, Shoretire played with Whitley Bay Boys Club, Newcastle City Juniors, Wallsend Boys Club, Hebburn Town and Cramlington Juniors. He was also briefly part of Manchester City's youth setup, but left to join rivals Manchester United at the age of nine.

Manchester United 
Shoretire quickly rose through the youth ranks of the Red Devils, frequently playing a year up his own age. In December 2018, he became the youngest ever player to appear in the UEFA Youth League at the age of 14 years and 314 days. In 2020, after impressing with the under-18s, Neil Wood, coach of the under-23s, handed him his under-23s debut when he was just 16. He scored a hat-trick in a 6–4 win for the under-23s against Blackburn Rovers in February 2021.

Shoretire signed his first professional contract with Manchester United on 8 February 2021, a week after turning 17. On 21 February 2021, he made his first-team debut for United as an 88th-minute substitute for Marcus Rashford in a 3–1 home league win over Newcastle United. Four days later, he became United's youngest player to make an appearance in a European competition, coming on as a substitute for Mason Greenwood in a 0–0 home draw against Real Sociedad in the UEFA Europa League at the age of 17 years and 23 days, beating the record set by Norman Whiteside 38 years earlier by 108 days. For his performances with the youth teams, Shoretire was named the Jimmy Murphy Young Player of the Year for 2020–21.

Loan to Bolton 
On 19 January 2023, Shoretire officially joined EFL League One club Bolton Wanderers on loan until the end of the season.

International career
As Shoretire was born in England to a Nigerian father and English mother, he is eligible to represent both nations at international level.

He made one appearance for the England under-15 team, in a friendly against Belgium in February 2019. He made two appearances for the England under-16 team in August 2019, against Denmark and the Republic of Ireland. On 29 March 2021, Shoretire made his debut and only appearance for the England under-18 team during a 2–0 away victory over Wales at the Leckwith Stadium in Cardiff.

On 2 September 2021, Shoretire made his debut for England at under-19 level during a 2–0 victory over Italy at St. George's Park. He has made four appearances for the under-19 team.

Career statistics

Honours
Manchester United
UEFA Europa League runner-up: 2020–21

Individual
Jimmy Murphy Young Player of the Year: 2020–21

References

External links

Profile at the Manchester United F.C. website

2004 births
Living people
Footballers from Newcastle upon Tyne
English footballers
Association football forwards
England youth international footballers
Wallsend Boys Club players
Newcastle United F.C. players
Sunderland A.F.C. players
Manchester City F.C. players
Manchester United F.C. players
Bolton Wanderers F.C. players
Black British sportspeople
Premier League players
English people of Nigerian descent